This is a list of years in Malta.

16th century

17th century

18th century

19th century

20th century

21st century

See also
Timeline of Maltese history

 

Malta history-related lists
Malta